European Artistic Gymnastics Championships part of European Gymnastics Championships may refer to:
 European Men's Artistic Gymnastics Championships
 European Women's Artistic Gymnastics Championships
 European Men's and Women's Artistic Gymnastics Individual Championships